Lewis Creber (1901-1966) (also billed as Lewis H. Creber) was a British art director who spent his career in the United States, working on well over a hundred films and television series. He worked for the major Hollywood studio Twentieth Century Fox for much of the 1930s and 1940s.

Selected filmography
 Bachelor of Arts (1934)
 Mystery Woman (1935)
 Champagne Charlie (1936)
 Charlie Chan at the Opera (1936)
 Dangerously Yours (1937)
 Charlie Chan at the Wax Museum (1940)
 Scotland Yard (1941)
 Pier 13 (1940)
 Sun Valley Serenade (1941)
 Charlie Chan in Rio (1941)
 Berlin Correspondent (1942)
 Manila Calling (1942)
 The Hammond Mystery (1942)
 Margin for Error (1943)
 Dixie Dugan (1943)
 Bomber's Moon (1943)
 Linda Be Good (1947)
 Caged Fury (1948)
 Perilous Waters (1948)
 El Paso (1949)
 Captain China (1950)
 The Dividing Line (1950)
 Tripoli (1950)
 Hong Kong (1952)
 Destination Gobi (1953)

References

Bibliography 
 Frederic Lombardi. Allan Dwan and the Rise and Decline of the Hollywood Studios. McFarland, 2013.

External links 
 

1901 births
1966 deaths
British art directors
British emigrants to the United States
People from Rotherham